Fahd Gomaa (born 11 January 1999) is an Egyptian professional footballer who plays as a forward for El Dakhleya, on loan from Al Ahly.

Career statistics

Club

Notes

External links

References

1999 births
Living people
Egyptian footballers
Association football forwards
Egyptian Premier League players
Al Ahly SC players
Smouha SC players